This is a list of broadcasters for the New Jersey Devils ice hockey team.

Television

On July 21, 2011, Emrick announced that he was leaving the New Jersey Devils to work exclusively for NBC Sports. In the beginning of the 2011–12 season, Steve Cangialosi replaced Emrick for play-by-play duties for the Devils. Cangialosi later announced on May 17, 2022 that he will step down from play-by-play commentary on Devils broadcasts. He is expected to be replaced by Bill Spaulding starting in the 2022-23 season. 

Ken Daneyko currently provides his color commentary on Devils' broadcasts on MSG Plus. Prior to this, he shared commentary and analysis between periods of Devils' broadcasts and was a regular starring analyst on MSG's Hockey Night Live! with host Al Trautwig and fellow commentators Ron Duguay, Dave Maloney, Mike Keenan, and Butch Goring, as well as "The Hockey Maven" Stan Fischler.

Current on-air staff

Television: MSG Plus

Radio

Notes
Ross first broadcast color commentary for the Devils from January 1992 through the strike-shortened 1994–95 season, prior to being re-hired for the role in 2007. On November 25, 2009, she called play-by-play of a game between the Devils and the Ottawa Senators, as Loughlin missed the game due to a death in his family, becoming the first woman to provide English language play-by-play for a full NHL game. On May 23, 2017, Ross was relieved of her duties as the Devils' radio analyst, and Chico Resch replaced her.

Current on-air staff
Radio: Audacy, WFAN (selected games)
Matt Loughlin – play-by-play
Chico Resch – color commentator

See also
Historical NHL over-the-air television broadcasters

References

External links
The State of New Jersey Devils Broadcasts in 2018
Devils and WFAN extend broadcast partnership
Ken Daneyko succeeds Chico Resch as Devils' TV analyst alongside Steve Cangialosi
New Jersey Devils | WFAN Sports Radio 66AM 101.9FM
ERIKA WACHTER NAMED NEW HOST FOR DEVILS COVERAGE

 
broadcasters
Lists of National Hockey League broadcasters
SportsChannel
Fox Sports Networks
Madison Square Garden Sports